HMS Defiance was a 64-gun third rate ship of the line of the Royal Navy, built by Phineas Pett II at Chatham Dockyard, and launched in 1675.

In the summer of 1678, Defiance was under the command of John Ernle.

She was rebuilt at Woolwich Dockyard in 1695, again as a 64-gun ship.

Defiance was part of a squadron under Vice-Admiral John Benbow in August 1702. In an action between Benbow's squadron and the squadron of the French Admiral Jean du Casse, Defiance under Captain Richard Kirkby was one of the ships that refused to engage. At his court-martial, Captain Kirkby was convicted of cowardice and sentenced to be shot.

In 1707, she was rebuilt for a second time, relaunching from Deptford Dockyard as a 66-gun third rate.

Defiance was reduced to a fourth rate in 1716.

On 30 August 1739, command of her was given to Captain John Trevor.

She was hulked in 1743 and was broken up in 1749.

Notes

References

Lavery, Brian (2003) The Ship of the Line - Volume 1: The development of the battlefleet 1650-1850. Conway Maritime Press. .
Michael Phillips. Breda (70) (1692). Michael Phillips' Ships of the Old Navy. Retrieved 9 December 2007.
Michael Phillips. Defiance (64) (1675). Michael Phillips' Ships of the Old Navy. Retrieved 9 December 2007.
'Office of the Lord High Admiral to Captain John Trevor', 30 August 1739, ADM 7/781, The National Archives at Kew

Ships of the line of the Royal Navy
1670s ships